The Fred and Lucia Farnham House is a historical house in Columbus, Wisconsin. The Italianate style home was designed, and constructed in 1867, by Columbus architect and carpentry contractor Richard D. Vanaken.

It was initially inhabited by Fred and Lucia Farnham. Fred Farnham (—1871), who was born Frederich F. Farnham in Vermont, was raised in Canada, and the state of New York. At the age of 25-years-old, he moved from the latter location to Columbus, where he joined his three sisters. Farnham became a prosperous merchant in the city. He married Lucia Marsh of New York, in 1850. Farnham and James Allen, Lucia's brother-in-law, then became business partners and ran a highly successful produce and wholesale store. The profits from the store allowed Fred Farnham to build his new house at a corner lot on West James Street, a significant street in Columbus. The two-story house has a cruciform plan main block, with a small kitchen wing in the back, similar to other Italianate houses in Columbus.

Historic listings

The house was added to Wisconsin's State Register of Historic Places on April 17, 2009, and the United States National Register of Historic Places on July 30, 2009.

The Fred and Lucia Farnham House's architect and builder, Richard D. Vanaken, in collaboration with architect Edward Townsend Mix, also designed Columbus' High Victorian Gothic and Italianate style Zion Evangelical Lutheran Church and Parsonage, first built in 1878.  This site was listed in the National Register of Historic Places, in the year 2009, as well. These two site listings are among 15 other historical sites located in the city of Columbus which are listed in the state and federal registers (as of May 4, 2010).

Additionally, Fred Farnham initiated the construction of an Italianate style building on 111 East James Street, for his and his brother-in-law's produce business usage, . This building, first known as the Farnham Block, and later the Schaeffer Block, was placed in both the state and federal registers in 1992, as a contributing property to the Columbus Downtown Historic District's listing.

Gallery

References

External links 
 
 National Register and State Register of Historic Places, Division of Historic Preservation, Wisconsin Historical Society, Madison, Wisconsin, Farnham, Fred and Lucia, House; Columbus, Columbia, Wisconsin, reference number 09000580
 Wisconsin Historical Society, Wisconsin Architecture and History Inventory, Farnham, Fred and Lucia, House, Columbus, Columbia, Wisconsin, reference number 3481

Houses on the National Register of Historic Places in Wisconsin
Italianate architecture in Wisconsin
Houses completed in 1867
Houses in Columbia County, Wisconsin
Columbus, Wisconsin
National Register of Historic Places in Columbia County, Wisconsin